Ofner is a German surname. Notable people with the surname include:

Harald Ofner (born 1932), Austrian lawyer and politician for the Freedom Party of Austria (FPÖ)
Katrin Ofner (born 1990), Austrian freestyle skier
Klaus Ofner (born 1968), Austrian nordic combined skier
Sebastian Ofner (born 1996), Austrian tennis player

See also
Offner

German-language surnames